Walkertown is a town in Forsyth County, North Carolina, United States and a rural area outside of Winston-Salem. It is part of the Piedmont Triad. The population was 5,695 at the 2020 census.

Geography
Walkertown is located in eastern Forsyth County at  (36.159159, -80.167661). It is bordered to the southwest by the city of Winston-Salem. U.S. Route 311 passes through the center of town, and U.S. Route 158 passes through the southeastern part; both highways lead southwest  to downtown Winston-Salem. US 311 continues north-northeast  to Madison, while US 158 leads east-northeast  to Reidsville. North Carolina Highway 66 crosses both highways, leading northwest  to Rural Hall. The future Interstate 74 currently designated as NC Highway 74, bypasses most of the town to the south while following parallel with NC 66; both highways going southeast connect the town to Kernersville, northwest to Rural Hall.

Demographics

2020 census

As of the 2020 United States census, there were 5,692 people, 2,052 households, and 1,486 families residing in the town.

2000 census
As of the census of 2000, there were 4,009 people, 1,696 households, and 1,187 families residing in the town. The population density was 683.6 people per square mile (264.1/km). There were 1,793 housing units at an average density of 305.7 per square mile (118.1/km). The racial makeup of the town was 88.03% White, 10.00% African American, 0.40% Native American, 0.30% Asian, 0.42% from other races, and 0.85% from two or more races. Hispanic or Latino of any race were 1.40% of the population.

There were 1,696 households, out of which 27.5% had children under the age of 18 living with them, 59.4% were married couples living together, 7.8% had a female householder with no husband present, and 30.0% were non-families. 26.6% of all households were made up of individuals, and 10.9% had someone living alone who was 65 years of age or older. The average household size was 2.36 and the average family size was 2.85.

In the town, the population was spread out, with 20.9% under the age of 18, 7.1% from 18 to 24, 29.8% from 25 to 44, 27.0% from 45 to 64, and 15.2% who were 65 years of age or older. The median age was 41 years. For every 100 females, there were 94.8 males. For every 100 females age 18 and over, there were 93.8 males.

The median income for a household in the town was $43,454, and the median income for a family was $53,679. Males had a median income of $36,558 versus $26,339 for females. The per capita income for the town was $21,304. About 2.7% of families and 4.9% of the population were below the poverty line, including 4.4% of those under age 18 and 6.3% of those age 65 or over.

The current mayor of the town is Kenneth "Doc" Davis.

History
Walkertown was named for Dr. Robert Walker who was living at the site by 1771. Walker left the area to relocate in the West, but his home remained standing through the mid-20th century. The town was incorporated in 1984.

The Thomas A. Crews House was listed on the National Register of Historic Places in 1993.

Notable person
 Riley Baugus, old-time guitarist.

References

External links
 Town of Walkertown official website
 Walkertown Area Historical Society
 Walkertown Public Library

Towns in Forsyth County, North Carolina
Towns in North Carolina
Populated places established in 1771